Andreas Gottlieb Freiherr von Bernstorff (2 March 1649 – 6 July 1726) was a German statesman and a member of the Bernstorff noble family of Mecklenburg. He was prime minister of the Electorate of Hanover from 1709 to 1714, and head of the German Chancery in London from 1714 to 1723.

German Chancery
Nobility from Hanover
1649 births
1726 deaths
Barons of Germany